Dude Duck is a 1951 American animated short film featuring Donald Duck; it was directed by Jack Hannah and produced by Walt Disney. In the short film, Donald goes on vacation to a dude ranch and gets a totally uncooperative horse as a mount.

Plot
Donald is vacationing at a dude ranch. After all the beautiful women pick the best horses, Donald ends up with the sad-sack Rover Boy. But Rover Boy wants nothing to do with him.

Voice cast
 Clarence Nash as Donald Duck and Rover Boy

Re-release
The short was re-released with DuckTales the Movie: Treasure of the Lost Lamp on August 3, 1990.

Television
 Disneyland, episode #2.22: "On Vacation" (1954)
 Good Morning, Mickey, episode #1 (1983)
 Vacationing With Mickey and Friends (1984)
 Donald Takes a Holiday (1986)
 Disney's Rootin' Tootin' Roundup (1990)
 Mickey's Mouse Tracks, episode #1 (1992)
 Donald's Quack Attack, episode #22 (1992)
 The Ink and Paint Club, episode #1.30: "'50s Donald" (1997)

Home media
The short was released on November 11, 2008, on Walt Disney Treasures: The Chronological Donald, Volume Four: 1951-1961.

Additional releases include:
 On Vacation with Mickey Mouse and Friends (VHS)

References

External links 
 
 Dude Duck at The Internet Animation Database
 Dude Duck on Filmaffinity

Donald Duck short films
Films produced by Walt Disney
1950s Disney animated short films
Films directed by Jack Hannah
1951 animated films
1951 films
Films scored by Paul Smith (film and television composer)
1950s English-language films